Bjørn Myrbakken (born August 15, 1972) is a Norwegian former ski jumper who competed from 1991 to 1995. He won a gold medal in the team large hill at the 1993 FIS Nordic World Ski Championships in Falun and finished 33rd in the individual normal hill in those same championships. 

Myrbakken's best individual finish at the Winter Olympics was 39th in the individual normal hill at Lillehammer in 1994. His best individual career finish was third twice in the large hill (1992 and 1993).

External links 

Norwegian male ski jumpers
Olympic ski jumpers of Norway
1972 births
Living people
Ski jumpers at the 1994 Winter Olympics
FIS Nordic World Ski Championships medalists in ski jumping
20th-century Norwegian people